Mate Vatsadze  (born 17 December 1988) is Georgian football player who plays for Dinamo Batumi.

Playing career
Vatsadze started his professional career with FC Dinamo Tbilisi, playing 96 games and scoring 42 goals for the first team between 2005 and 2010, before moving to FC Volga Nizhny Novgorod to play in the Russian Premier League in 2011. While playing in Russia, he was called up for the Georgia national football team, to play in the Euro 2012 qualifying matches against Croatia and Israel, but he was not able to get the required visa. So he soon returned to Georgia to join Dila Gori at the end of the season. On 2 September 2012 he signed a -year contract with Danish Superliga side AGF

Vatsadze was discovered by AGF in the 2012–13 Europa League Second qualifying round where he impressed by scoring three goals for Dila Gori against AGF and went on to score twice in the Third qualifying round away leg in Cyprus against Anorthosis, to help Dila Gori progress to the Play-off round. Vatsadze also scored twice in the 2010–11 UEFA Europa League Second qualifying round, helping Dinamo Tbilisi to eliminate Swedish Gefle IF, when they managed to beat them both home and away. He also scored a goal for Dinamo Tbilisi in the 2009–10 UEFA Europa League Third qualifying round, in the away leg against Red Star Belgrade.

Vatsadze joined FK Liepāja in Latvia in January 2019.

International goals
Scores and results list Georgia's goal tally first.

Honours
Dinamo Tbilisi
Umaglesi Liga: 2007–08
Georgian Cup: 2008–09
Georgian Super Cup: 2008

Dila Gori
Georgian Cup: 2011–12

AGF
Danish First Division: Promoted 2014–15
Danish Cup: Runner-up 2015–16

References

External links
  Mate Vatsadze on Soccerway
  Official Danish Superliga stats
  Player profile at uefa.com

1988 births
Living people
Footballers from Georgia (country)
Expatriate footballers from Georgia (country)
Georgia (country) international footballers
Georgia (country) under-21 international footballers
Association football forwards
FC Dinamo Tbilisi players
FC Volga Nizhny Novgorod players
Aarhus Gymnastikforening players
Silkeborg IF players
FK Liepāja players
FC Dila Gori players
FC Locomotive Tbilisi players
Viborg FF players
FC Qizilqum Zarafshon players
FC AGMK players
Russian Premier League players
Uzbekistan Super League players
Erovnuli Liga players
Danish Superliga players
Danish 1st Division players
Latvian Higher League players
Expatriate sportspeople from Georgia (country) in Russia
Expatriate sportspeople from Georgia (country) in Denmark
Expatriate sportspeople from Georgia (country) in Latvia
Expatriate sportspeople from Georgia (country) in Uzbekistan
Expatriate footballers in Russia
Expatriate men's footballers in Denmark
Expatriate footballers in Latvia
Expatriate footballers in Uzbekistan
Footballers from Tbilisi